WIPA is a FM radio staiton in Pittsfield, Illinois.

WIPA may also refer to:

 West Indies Players' Association
 Sultan Thaha Airport (ICAO: WIPA), Jambi City, Jambi, Sumatra